Northshore Hamilton ferry wharf is located on the northern side of the Brisbane River serving the Brisbane suburb of Hamilton in Queensland, Australia. It is the downstream terminus for RiverCity Ferries' CityCat services.

History 
The wharf opened on 2 October 2011. It has pontoons for two CityCats and a waiting area with seating for 24 people. The design of the terminal is based on a shipping container.

References

External links

Ferry wharves in Brisbane
Hamilton, Queensland
Transport infrastructure completed in 2011